Acacia rostriformis, commonly known as Bacchus Marsh  wattle, is a plant species that is endemic to Australia. It was first formally described in 2009 in the journal Muelleria.

References 

rostriformis
Flora of Victoria (Australia)
Fabales of Australia
Plants described in 2009
Taxa named by Bruce Maslin
Taxa named by Daniel J. Murphy